Simon James Gathercole (born 8 July 1974) is a United Kingdom New Testament scholar, Professor of New Testament and Early Christianity, and Director of Studies at Fitzwilliam College, Cambridge.

Biography
Gathercole completed a degree in Classics and Theology at Cambridge and then pursued doctoral research at Durham University under the supervision of James D. G. Dunn, with funding from the Arts and Humanities Research Council, the German Academic Exchange Service and Hatfield College. He also studied for short periods at the University of Tübingen and the Jewish Theological Seminary, New York. He was formerly Senior Lecturer in New Testament at the University of Aberdeen.

Drawn from his dissertation, his book Where is Boasting? (2002) was a critique of the New Perspective on Paul, and focused on Second-Temple Judaism and Romans 1-5.

Since 2007, Gathercole has served as editor of the Journal for the Study of the New Testament.

Works

Thesis

Books
 
 
 
 
 
 
 
The Apocryphal Gospels (2021). Penguin Classics. ISBN 9780241340554

as Editor

Articles and Chapters

References

External links
 Faculty Page at University of Cambridge

Academics of the University of Aberdeen
Academic journal editors
Alumni of Hatfield College, Durham
British biblical scholars
Fellows of Fitzwilliam College, Cambridge
Living people
New Testament scholars
1974 births